Diolcus irroratus is a species of shield-backed bug in the family Scutelleridae. It is found in the Caribbean Sea and North America.

References

Scutelleridae
Articles created by Qbugbot
Insects described in 1775
Taxa named by Johan Christian Fabricius